Boss is an American political drama television serial created by Farhad Safinia. The series stars Kelsey Grammer as Tom Kane, the mayor of Chicago, who has recently been diagnosed with Lewy body dementia, a degenerative neurological disorder.

The series was broadcast in the United States on the premium television service Starz and was produced by Category 5 Entertainment, Grammnet Productions and Lionsgate Television. On September 27, 2011, before the series premiered, Starz announced that Boss had been renewed for a second season of ten episodes. The first season premiered on October 21, 2011 and the second season premiered on August 17, 2012.

On November 20, 2012, it was announced that Starz had cancelled the show. A film was discussed to finish the show's storylines, but those plans were cancelled after series creator Farhad Safinia declined to move forward with the project.

Overview
As the series commences we follow Tom Kane, the Mayor of Chicago, who has been diagnosed with dementia with Lewy bodies, a degenerative neurological disorder. Determined to remain in charge, Kane conceals the disease from everyone around him except his own physician, Dr. Ella Harris. Kane's marriage to Meredith is one of convenience. His closest advisors, Kitty O'Neill and Ezra Stone, begin to suspect something is wrong with the Mayor but respect the boundary he has erected that precludes asking such questions, though lapses on Kane's part begin to become apparent to others around him, such as the current Illinois governor McCall "Mac" Cullen and The Sentinels political journalist Sam Miller. Meanwhile, Kane and his team work behind the scenes to groom State Treasurer Ben Zajac to become the next Governor of Illinois.

Cast

Main cast
 Kelsey Grammer as Tom Kane, the Mayor of Chicago
 Connie Nielsen as Meredith Kane, Tom's wife
 Hannah Ware as Emma Kane, Tom Kane's estranged daughter
 Jeff Hephner as Ben Zajac, Illinois State Treasurer and candidate for Governor
 Kathleen Robertson as Kitty O'Neill, Tom Kane's personal aide
 Martin Donovan as Ezra Stone (Main cast season 1; Recurring season 2), Tom Kane's senior political advisor
 Troy Garity as Sam Miller (Recurring Season 1; Main cast Season 2), a political journalist working for The Sentinel
 Jonathan Groff as Ian Todd (Season 2), a political upstart trying to get Kane's ear
 Rotimi as Darius (Recurring Season 1; Main cast Season 2), a drug dealer with whom Emma is romantically involved
 Daniel J. Travanti as Gerald 'Babe' McGantry
 Tip "T.I." Harris as Trey (Season 2), a former gang member with designs on a career in Chicago's City Hall
 Sanaa Lathan as Mona Fredricks (Season 2), Tom Kane's new chief of staff.

Recurring cast
 Francis Guinan as McCall "Mac" Cullen (Season 1–2), Governor of Illinois, who is running for re-election
 Amy Morton as Catherine Walsh (Season 2), the Republican candidate for governor
 Nicole Forester as Maggie Zajac (Season 1–2), Ben Zajac's wife
 Karen Aldridge as Dr. Ella Harris (Season 1–2), Tom Kane's neurologist
 James Vincent Meredith as Alderman Ross (Season 1–2), an alderman serving on the Chicago City Council, from the South Side
 Anthony Mockus, Sr. as Mayor Rutledge (Season 1–2), Tom Kane's predecessor and Meredith's father, who is in a catatonic state
 Gil Bellows as Vacarro (Season 2), casino investor and Meredith's lover
 Doug James as the Grey Haired Man (Season 1–2), Tom Kane's enforcer
 Jennifer Mudge as Debra Whitehead (Season 1), caretaker / nurse to Tom Kane's father-in-law
 Ricardo Gutierrez as Alderman Mata (Season 1), an alderman serving on the Chicago City Council, representing the 30th ward
 Joe Minoso as Moco Ruiz (Season 1), the head of a construction company working on the O'Hare expansion
 Steve Lenz as Phone Monkey (Season 1–2), an aide to Tom Kane
 Danny Goldring as Ryan Kavanaugh (Season 1–2), Tom Kane's childhood friend and former homicide detective
 Richard Perez, as Alderman Ortiz
 Mary Hollis Inboden as Jackie Shope (Season 1–2), a journalist at The Sentinel working under Sam Miller

Development and production
Farhad Safinia developed Boss in late 2009, with creative input from Kelsey Grammer and his production company Grammnet Productions. In November 2010, the script was shopped around to various cable networks and, following a heated and contentious bidding war, Starz placed an eight episode order for the series, based solely on the strength of the script. This was in keeping with Starz's business model of not ordering pilots but rather green-lighting projects straight-to-series. Safinia wrote the pilot, Gus Van Sant was attached to the project as director, with Grammer, Safinia, Van Sant, Richard Levine, Lyn Greene, Brian Sher and Stella Bulochnikov-Stopler serving as executive producers.

Casting announcements began in November 2010, with Grammer first to be cast. He portrays Tom Kane, "the Mayor of Chicago who is diagnosed with a degenerative mental condition that only he and his doctor know about". Next to join the series was Connie Nielsen as Meredith Kane, Tom's wife: "Meredith and Kane have a bad marriage and barely speak when they aren't in public". Jeff Hephner was next to be cast, as Ben Zajac, "the state's treasurer, an impeccably handsome and ambitious Chicago native who is clearly about to become a major player on the Chicago political scene". Hannah Ware and Kathleen Robertson were the last actors to join the main cast, with Ware playing Emma Kane, Tom Kane's estranged daughter, and Robertson playing Kitty O'Neil, Kane's personal aide.

Starz later announced that Martin Donovan, Francis Guinan, Rotimi Akinosho, Karen Aldridge, Troy Garity, Ricardo Gutierrez, James Vincent Meredith and Joe Minoso had joined the series as recurring guest stars. Martin Donovan was cast as Ezra Stone, "A savvy Yale graduate, and senior advisor to Kane, Stone knows the Mayor better than anyone. Whether it's pushing Kane's agenda, or assisting with personal matters, Ezra always delivers". Francis Guinan was cast as Governor McCall "Mac" Cullen, "The governor of Illinois, Cullen hates playing along with the Mayor's apparent unwavering support for his re-election bid. And his ugly temper is getting even worse". Rotimi Akinosho was cast as Darius, "a muscular drug dealer who's covered in tattoos, but he's smart, well spoken, and cares for his sick uncle". Karen Aldrige was cast as Dr. Ella Harris, Mayor Kane's neurologist and (initially) the only other person who knows about his current medical condition. Garity was cast as Sam Miller, "a politically savvy journalist for The Sentinel, with a nose for a real story". Ricardo Gutierrez was cast as Alderman Mata, "Political boss of the 30th ward, Mata is a thug in a suit who believes the ends justify the means, however vicious". James Vincent Meredith was cast as Alderman Ross, "Kane's biggest rival", and Joe Minoso was cast as Moco Ruiz, "A construction worker, Ruiz is one of Mata's guys".

The series was filmed between April 27, 2011, and July 27, 2011, on location in Chicago, Illinois.

At the 2011 Television Critics Association Summer Press Tour, Starz announced that Boss would premiere on October 21, 2011; the second season premiered on August 17, 2012. The series was produced by Category 5 Entertainment, Grammnet Productions, and Lionsgate Television.

Episodes

Series overview

Season 1 (2011)

Season 2 (2012)

Reception

Awards and nominations
The series received two nominations for the 69th Golden Globe Awards for Best Drama Series and Kelsey Grammer received a nomination for Golden Globe Award for Best Actor – Television Series Drama. Kelsey Grammer won his category, while the show lost out to Homeland.

Ratings
The show garnered a total of 1.7 million viewers across multiple airings in its opening weekend. By comparison, other Starz TV series such as Spartacus: Gods of the Arena delivered 2.8 million viewers in its first weekend, Torchwood: Miracle Day produced 2 million viewers, and Camelot had 1.6 million viewers for the Friday airings alone. However, just two weeks later, the ratings had fallen to around a quarter of a million. The third episode, "Swallow", aired on November 4, 2011 averaged only 268,000 viewers — down 31% from the week before on October 28 ("Reflex"), which had just 391,000 viewers.

In an attempt to garner more television viewers, Starz shifted the season two premiere date from October 21, 2012 to August 17, 2012. This placed the season two premiere in a more advantageous state; between the finales of most summer shows on cable and the traditional launch of the fall television season, where an October launch would have been buried with many other programs. Starz also put the season two premiere full episode online for free on August 20, 2012 for a limited time.

The season two premiere had 317,000 viewers, which was less than half of the 659,000 viewers who watched the series premiere. With encores that same night, the ratings rose to 509,000 viewers. Over the weekend, the season premiere pulled in 915,000 viewers, just under the 1.1 million average in the first season.

The show's low ratings are cited as the main reason for its cancellation.

Critical reception
On Rotten Tomatoes, Season 1 has an approval rating of 79% based on reviews from 28 critics. The website's critical consensus states: "A mature drama, Boss constructs political devolution with ease and packs a powerful punch with steamy tales of corruption and sex." Season 2 has an approval rating of 89% based on reviews from 18 critics. The website's critical consensus states: "Kelsey Grammar alone provides ample reason to watch Boss, but the rest of the stellar supporting cast of wretchedly fascinating, emotionally entangled characters holds viewer attention." On Metacritic, Season 1 has a score of 78 out of 100, based on reviews from 24 critics. Season 2 has a score of 75 out of 100, based on reviews from 18 critics.

International broadcasts

References

External links

 

2010s American drama television series
2010s American political television series
2011 American television series debuts
2012 American television series endings
American political drama television series
English-language television shows
Starz original programming
Television series by Lionsgate Television
Television shows set in Chicago